West Farms is an unincorporated community located within Howell Township in Monmouth County, New Jersey, United States. The settlement is centered on the intersection of West Farms Road and Casino Drive, located to the west of Farmingdale and to the north of the Manasquan Reservoir. It was once home Jewish farmers who settled there in the early 20th century. The rural area is mostly made up of wooded areas with some houses and churches dotted along the two aforementioned roads. Numerous small farms are also located throughout the area.

References

Neighborhoods in Howell Township, New Jersey
Unincorporated communities in Monmouth County, New Jersey
Unincorporated communities in New Jersey